The 1946–47 Southern Football League season was the 44th in the history of the league, an English football competition.

The league featured eight new clubs, including Football League members Millwall, who also entered their first team in the Southern League. However, due to fixture congestion, they only played 24 matches, with the remaining fixtures all being awarded as 0–0 draws. Yeovil & Petters United were renamed Yeovil Town at the end of the previous season.

A total of 17 clubs contest the division, including nine clubs from previous season, three clubs missed previous season and five new clubs.

Clubs missed previous season:
Dartford
Gloucester City
Guildford City

Newly elected clubs:
Gravesend & Northfleet - new club, formed as a merger of Gravesend United and Northfleet United
Gillingham - returned after resigning in 1939
Merthyr Tydfil - runners-up of Welsh Football League
Millwall
Exeter City II

Gillingham were champions, winning their first Southern League title. At the end of the season Millwall resigned from the league.

League table

Football League elections
Barry Town, Bath City, Chelmsford City, Colchester United, Gillingham, Gravesend & Northfleet, Guildford City, Merthyr Tydfil, Worcester City and Yeovil Town were amongst 27 non-League clubs to apply for election to the Football League. However, as the two clubs relegated from Division Two to the regional divisions Three were both from the south, the Football League secretary had suggested that electing new members could create an imbalance in the divisions' geographical boundaries, and that instead all four clubs (Halifax, Mansfield, Norwich and Southport) should be re-elected en bloc. This was accepted and no elections took place.

References

Southern Football League seasons
S